The De Havilland 9209-class was a coastal patrol boat class that served with the Philippine Navy. They are usually assigned on coastal patrol, mostly around Manila Bay area for harbor and naval base security, as well as security during events in Manila.

The boats were built by De Havilland Marine of New South Wales, Australia, and were delivered in the mid 1980s.

It was initially designated as Small Patrol Craft with a hull initial "DF", but later on was re-designated as a Yard Patrol Craft, and was finally re-designated as "PC".

The entire class was deactivated from Philippine Navy service on 17 December 2020, and are scheduled to be replaced with newer boats, most likely versions of the Multi-Purpose Attack Craft (MPAC).

Ships in Class

Gallery

Footnotes

See also
List of decommissioned ships of the Philippine Navy

References

Patrol vessels of the Philippine Navy
Patrol boat classes
Ships built in New South Wales